Ansaldo is an Italian name of Germanic origin. It was originally a masculine given name and was later also used as a surname.

People with the given name
 Ansaldo Doria (1134–1174), Genoese statesman and commander of the noble Doria family
 Ansaldo Poggi (1893–1984), Italian maker of stringed instruments

People with the surname
 Cecilia Ansaldo (born 1949), Ecuadorian professor, writer, and critic
 Giovanni Andrea Ansaldo (1584–1638), Italian painter from Genoa
 Giovanni Battista Ansaldo (fl. 1576–1578), Italian Roman Catholic bishop
 Juan Antonio Ansaldo (1910–1958), Spanish aviator and political activist

See also
 Ansaldo (disambiguation)
 Oswald (given name)

References

Italian-language surnames
Italian masculine given names
Surnames of German origin